Géza Kertész (18 November 1894 – 6 February 1945), also known as Kertész IV, was a Hungarian footballer and manager from Budapest. He is most noted for his career as a football manager in Italy at clubs such as Lazio, Roma and Atalanta.

Death
During World War II, Kertesz returned from Italy to Hungary in 1943, when he was recalled to serve as lieutenant-colonel in the Hungarian Army in training role. In liaison with the American secret service he set up a clandestine resistance network with former teammate Istvan Toth which rescued many Hungarian partisans and Jews from deportation to Nazi concentration camps during German occupation and Arrow Cross Party rule, sometimes disguising himself as a German Wehrmacht officer for cover. He was denounced to the Gestapo by an informer for sheltering Jews and was executed at Budapest alongside Toth on 6 February 1945, a few days before the city was liberated by the Soviet forces.

His body and that of Toth were reburied together with honour at Kerepesi Cemetery, Budapest, in April 1946.

References

1894 births
1945 deaths
Footballers from Budapest
Hungarian footballers
Association football midfielders
Ferencvárosi TC footballers
Spezia Calcio players
Hungarian football managers
Carrarese Calcio managers
U.S. Salernitana 1919 managers
U.S. Catanzaro 1929 managers
Catania S.S.D. managers
Atalanta B.C. managers
S.S. Lazio managers
A.S. Roma managers
Újpest FC managers
Expatriate football managers in Italy
Hungarian expatriate football managers
People executed by the Government of National Unity (Hungary)
Hungary international footballers
Burials at Kerepesi Cemetery
Hungarian resistance members